CKLG may refer to:

 CJAX-FM, a radio station (96.9 FM) licensed to Vancouver, British Columbia, Canada, which held the call sign CKLG-FM from 2002 to 2014
 CHMJ, a radio station (730 AM) licensed to Vancouver, British Columbia, Canada, which held the call sign CKLG from 1955 to 2001
 CFOX-FM, a radio station (99.3 FM) licensed to Vancouver, British Columbia, Canada, which held the call sign CKLG-FM from 1964 to 1979